The Angola women's national basketball team Under-16 represents Angola in international basketball competitions and is controlled by the Federação Angolana de Basquetebol. At continental level, it competes at the FIBA Africa Under-16 Championship for Women which is eligible for the FIBA Under-17 World Championship for Women. Angola has been a member of FIBA since 1979.

Current roster

Head coach position
  Elisa Pires

FIBA Under-17 World Championship for Women record
 2024 FIBA Under-17 Women’s Basketball World Cup: TBD
 2022 FIBA Under-17 Women’s Basketball World Cup: Not Qualified
 2018 FIBA Under-17 Women’s Basketball World Cup: 16th
 2016 FIBA Under-17 World Championship for Women: Not Qualified
 2014 FIBA Under-17 World Championship for Women: Not Qualified
 2012 FIBA Under-17 World Championship for Women: Not Qualified
 2010 FIBA Under-17 World Championship for Women: Not Qualified

African Championship for Women record

Players

A = African championship

Manager history
 Elisa Pires 2017
 Fernando Figueiredo 2015
 Apolinário Paquete 2013
 Elisa Pires 2011
 João António 2009

See also
 Angola women's national basketball team
 Angola women's national basketball team Under-20
 Angola women's national basketball team Under-18
 Angola women's youth handball team

References

External links
 2011 Team profile at FIBA.com

under
Women's national under-16 basketball teams
Women's national under-17 basketball teams